Asa Wentworth Jr. (April 4, 1797 – August 7, 1882) was a Vermont businessman and politician who served as President of the Vermont State Senate.

Biography
Asa Wentworth Jr. was born in Alstead, New Hampshire on April 4, 1797.  He was raised and educated in Alstead, became active in business, and represented Alstead as a Whig in the New Hampshire House of Representatives from 1828 to 1829, and again in 1832.

Wentworth was also active in the New Hampshire militia, and attained the rank of Colonel.

Wentworth subsequently relocated to Bellows Falls, Vermont.  He was a Vice President of the Bellows Falls Savings Institution, and later a Director of the Bellows Falls National Bank. In addition he operated a hardware business with his brother, A. & J. H. Wentworth.

Active in local government, Wentworth served as Rockingham's Town Treasurer from 1846 to 1870, and was also the longtime Treasurer of Rockingham's School District.

Maintaining his Whig affiliation until joining the Republican Party at its founding, Wentworth served in the Vermont House of Representatives from 1838 to 1839 and 1848 to 1849.

He served in the Vermont Senate from 1851 to 1852 was Senate President.

Wentworth returned to the Vermont House from 1852 to 1853 and again in 1856.

Wentworth died in Bellows Falls on August 7, 1882.  He was buried in Bellows Falls's Immanuel Cemetery.

References

1797 births
1882 deaths
Members of the New Hampshire House of Representatives
Members of the Vermont House of Representatives
New Hampshire Whigs
19th-century American politicians
People from Bellows Falls, Vermont
People from Alstead, New Hampshire
Vermont Republicans
Vermont state senators
Presidents pro tempore of the Vermont Senate
Vermont Whigs
Burials in Vermont